The following is a list of notable graduates of Fairfield University in Fairfield, Connecticut:

Notable alumni

Arts and entertainment

The Alternate Routes – award-winning alternative rock band formed by Eric Donnelly (2001) and Tim Warren (2003)
Donatella Arpaia (1993) – successful New York City restaurateur; judge on The Food Network reality TV series The Next Iron Chef
Edward J. Delaney (1979) – award-winning author; Professor of Creative Writing, Roger Williams University
Joe DeVito (1990) – comedian and writer; appeared on Comedy Central's "Live at Gotham" and NBC's Last Comic Standing
Bob Drury (1980) – New York Times Bestselling author
Paul Fargis (1961) – founder of Stonesong, publisher of several bestselling reference books
Githa Hariharan (1977) – Commonwealth Writers' Prize winning author and editor
Pat Jordan (1965) – acclaimed author of A False Spring, ranked #37 on Sports Illustrateds 100 Top Sports Books
Burt Kearns (1978) – founder, Frozen Television/Frozen Pictures; author, Tabloid Baby; producer, A Current Affair
Adam LaVorgna (2011) – actor best known as Robbie Palmer in the TV series 7th Heaven
January LaVoy (1997) – actress best known as Noelle Ortiz on the ABC daytime drama One Life to Live
Paul Marcarelli (1992) – actor/screenwriter best known as the face of the Verizon Wireless "Can You Hear Me Now?" national TV campaign
Peter McCann (1970) - singer/songwriter, best known for Do You Wanna Make Love (1977)
Kevin Nealon – Saturday Night Live cast member
Ron Palillo – actor best known as Arnold Horshack on Welcome Back, Kotter
Neil Peng – Taiwanese screenwriter and political activist
Paul Ryan Rudd (1970) – actor who played John F. Kennedy in the 1977 NBC movie Johnny, We Hardly Knew Ye
Rob Stevenson (1992) – president of Virgin Records US
Melissa Tantaquidgeon Zobel (2012) – Mohegan author, historian, and storyteller
Jim Wilbur (1986) - guitarist for American indie-rock band Superchunk

Academia
Ronald A. Bosco (1967)– Distinguished Professor of English and American Literature, University at Albany
William Doerner (1971) – Professor, Florida State University, College of Criminology and Criminal Justice
James Hanrahan (1952) – founding Chancellor, St. Thomas More School
Edward Hardiman (1991) - Headmaster, St. John's Preparatory School (Massachusetts)
Zachary Freedman (2005) - O.N. Allen Professor of Soil Microbiology, University of Wisconsin-Madison
Thomas Kelly - Head of School, Horace Mann School
Kevin Kiernan (1967) – T. Marshall Hahn Sr. Professor of Arts and Sciences Emeritus, University of Kentucky
Katherine Lapp (1978) – Executive Vice President of Harvard University
Harry Marmion (1953) – President of Saint Xavier University, Stony Brook Southampton and United States Tennis Association 
Bernard McGrane (1969) – Associate Professor of Sociology, Chapman University
Robert J. McMahon (1971) – Ralph D. Mershon Professor of History, The Ohio State University
David J. McCarthy, Jr. (1957) – Dean Emeritus, Georgetown University Law Center
Joseph Moylan (1960) – founding President, Durham Nativity School; professor of surgery, Duke University School of Medicine
Maurice J. O'Sullivan (1966) – Kenneth Curry Chair of Literature, Rollins College
Thomas Poon (1990) – Executive Vice President and Provost, Loyola Marymount University; Acting and Interim President, Pitzer College
Donald Preziosi (1962) – leading art historian and author; Slade Professor of Fine Art, Oxford University; Professor Emeritus, UCLA 
Mark Reed (1996) – President of St. Joseph's University
Charles E. Schaefer (1955) – "Father of Play Therapy"; Professor of Psychology, Fairleigh Dickinson University
Kurt C. Schlichting (1970) – E. Gerald Corrigan Endowed Chair in the Humanities and Social Sciences, Fairfield University
John Skoyles (1971) – poet and writer; Professor of Writing, Literature & Publishing, Emerson College

Business
Michael Amalfitano (1979) - president and CEO, Embraer Executive Jets 
Michael G. Archbold (1975) – former CEO, Talbots, Vitamin Shoppe and GNC
Joseph Berardino (1972) – managing director, Alvarez & Marsal; former CEO, Arthur Andersen
Logan Beirne (2005) – CEO, Matterhorne Transactions; 2014 William E. Colby Award winner
Joseph P. Brennan (1991) - Global Chief Risk Officer, The Vanguard Group 
Jeff Campbell (1965) – former CEO, Burger King; ex-chairman, Pillsbury Restaurant Group
Carlos M. Cardoso (1980) – president and CEO, Kennametal; named a Best CEO by Institutional Investor Magazine
Orlando P. Carvalho - Executive Vice President of the Aeronautics Division at Lockheed Martin
David H. Chafey, Jr. (1976) – president, Banco Popular de Puerto Rico
Susan Coffey (1986) - CEO, American Institute of Certified Public Accountants
Timothy J. Conway (1976) – founder, chairman and CEO, NewStar Financial
E. Gerald Corrigan (1963) – former president and CEO, Federal Reserve Bank of New York
Bill Crager (1986) - founder and CEO, Envestnet
Joseph DiMenna (1980) – co-founder, Zweig-DiMenna Associates
Charles Dolan (2016) – founder of Cablevision and HBO
William P. Egan (1967) – founder and general partner, Alta Communications and Marion Equity Partners
Jorge Figueredo (1982) – executive vice president, McKesson Corporation; 100 "Most Influential Hispanics" by Hispanic Business
John L. Flannery (1983) – chairman & CEO, General Electric
Bob Galvin (1981) - CEO, Iconix Brand Group
Judith E. Glaser – founder and CEO, Benchmark Communications
Joseph E. Hasten (1974) – president and CEO, ShoreBank; former vice chairman, U.S. Bancorp
George F. Keane (1955) – founder, Common Fund
Joseph D. Macchia (1957) – founder and CEO, GAINSCO
Shawn Matthews (1989) – CEO, Cantor Fitzgerald
Christopher McCormick (1978) – president and CEO, L.L. Bean
Andrew McMahon (1989) - CEO, The Guardian Life Insurance of America
Kathleen Murphy (1984) – President of Fidelity Personal Investing; Fortune Magazine's 50 Most Powerful Women in Business
Jennifer Piepszak (1992) - Chief Financial Officer (CFO) of JPMorgan Chase 
Peter J. Pestillo (1960) – former chairman and CEO, Visteon
Rick Pych (1975) – president of business operations, San Antonio Spurs
Leslie C. Quick Jr. (1999) – co-founder of Quick & Reilly
Larry Rafferty (1964) – founder and CEO, Rafferty Capital Markets
Steven C. Rockefeller, Jr. (1985) - chairman and CEO, Rose Rock Group
Eileen Rominger (1976) – former global chief investment officer, Goldman Sachs Asset Management
Ronan Ryan (1996) – president, Investor's Exchange; character in Michael Lewis’ best-seller, Flash Boys: A Wall Street Revolt
Joseph D. Sargent (1959) – former president and CEO, Guardian Life Insurance Company of America
Phil Singleton (1993) – author and founding CEO of Kansas City Web Design
Marita Zuraitis (1974) - president and CEO, Horace Mann Educator Corporation

Journalism

Rob Finnerty (2005) - News host on Newsmax
Sonia Isabelle (1997) – Emmy Award-winning news anchor; host of Celebrity Page, a nationally syndicated TV magazine show
Susan King (1973) – Emmy Award-winning TV news anchor; Dean, University of North Carolina School of Media and Journalism
Bill McDonald (1975) – Pulitzer Prize-winning New York Times editor
Donna Savarese (1984) – Emmy Award- and Edward R. Murrow Award-winning TV news anchor
Bob Sullivan (1990) – award-winning journalist, New York Times best-selling author; founding staff member, msnbc.com
Carmen Wong Ulrich (1992) – personal finance journalist; host, CNBC's On the Money
Liz Wahl (2008) – former Russia Today news anchor who quit on air for ethical reasons

Judges
Sean Connelly (1980) – Colorado Court of Appeals Judge; Special Attorney to U.S. Attorney Generals Ashcroft and Reno
John A. Danaher III (1992) – Connecticut Superior Court Judge; 47th United States Attorney For the District of Connecticut
Raymond J. Dearie (1966) – United States Foreign Intelligence Surveillance Court Judge
Daniel J. Dinan (1952) – United States Tax Court Special Trial Judge
Joseph P. Flynn (1962) – Connecticut Appellate Court Chief Judge
William J. Lavery (1959) – Connecticut Appellate Court Chief Judge
Steve Shannon (1993) – Circuit Court Judge in the 19th Judicial Circuit of Virginia

Law and government

Stephen L. Braga (1978) – lawyer known for pro bono representation of Martin Tankleff and the West Memphis Three
Stephen Buoniconti (1991) – Massachusetts State Senator
J. Edward Caldwell (1967) – Connecticut State Comptroller and State Senator
Vincent Cianci (1962) – 32nd and 34th Mayor of Providence, Rhode Island; longest standing mayor in the United States
Donald DeFronzo (1970) – Connecticut State Senator; Chief Assistant Majority Leader; Mayor, New Britain, Connecticut
J. Michael Farren (1977) – Deputy White House Counsel; Under Secretary of Commerce for International Trade
C. Frank Figliuzzi (1987) – Assistant Director of the Federal Bureau of Investigation Counterintelligence Division
Michael Fedele (1980) – 87th Lieutenant Governor of the State of Connecticut
Brian J. Flaherty (1987) – eight-term Connecticut State Representative; Deputy House Minority Leader 
Thomas J. Josefiak (1968) – Chairman, Federal Election Commission; Chief Counsel, Republican National Committee
Kevin C. Kelly (1985) – Connecticut State Senator
Martin Looney (1970) – President Pro Tempore of the Connecticut State Senate
Edward Mazurek (1968) – Maine State Senator
Richard Morgan Downey (1968) – Executive director and CEO, American Obesity Association
Thomas C. O'Connor (1955) – Mayor of Norwalk, Connecticut
Leonard S. Paoletta (1956) – 48th Mayor of Bridgeport, Connecticut
Jorge E. Pérez-Díaz (1977) – Attorney General and Solicitor General, Commonwealth of Puerto Rico
Chris Pilkerton (1995) - Administrator of the Small Business Administration
Rosa Rebimbas (2004) – Connecticut State Representative
David Rothbard – Co-founder and president, Committee For A Constructive Tomorrow (CFACT)
Joseph Russoniello (1963) – two-term U.S. Attorney for the Northern District of California
Thomas Spota (1980) – District Attorney of Suffolk County, New York
Steven Stafstrom (2005) - Connecticut State Representative
Bob Stefanowski (1984) - Republican nominee for Governor of Connecticut in 2018
Nancy Vaughan (1981) – Mayor of Greensboro, North Carolina
Roy J. Wells – president and managing director, Triad Strategies

Medicine and science

James L. Abbruzzese (1974) – internationally recognized pancreatic cancer researcher at the Duke Cancer Institute
David C. Christiani (1979) - Elkan Blout Professor of Environmental Health at Harvard T.H. Chan School of Public Health
J. Kevin Dorsey (1964) – dean and provost of the Southern Illinois University School of Medicine
Steven Flanagan (1984) – nationally renowned expert on Traumatic Brain Injuries at the Rusk Institute of Rehabilitation Medicine
Tatiana Foroud (1987) –  internationally recognized genetic researcher at the Indiana University School of Medicine
Doris Troth Lippman – Vietnam Women's Memorial Vice-Chair; Honorary Purple Heart recipient
John T. Lis (1970) – 2000 Guggenheim Fellow; Barbara McClintock Professor of Molecular Biology and Genetics at Cornell University 
Jean Malecki – Local Legend honoree by the National Library of Medicine
Gregory J. Martin (1980) – Chief of Infectious Diseases, Bethesda Naval Hospital; U.S. Navy Legion of Merit recipient
Brian Monahan (1980) – Attending Physician of the United States Congress; Rear Admiral in the United States Navy
Richard J. Murphy (1973) - President and CEO Mount Sinai South Nassau Hospital; CEO Richmond University Medical Center; CEO Good Samaritan Hospital Medical Center
Caitlin O'Connell-Rodwell (1987) – world renowned elephant expert; instructor at Stanford University Medical School
Peter Pronovost (1984) – 2008 MacArthur Fellow and Time 100 World's Most Influential People
Richard Proto (1962) - noted cryptographer elected to the United States National Security Agency Hall of Honor
Julio Ramirez (1977) – national leader in neuroscience education; R. Stuart Dickson Professor of Psychology at Davidson College
Francis J. Tedesco (1965) – president emeritus, Medical College of Georgia

Social action and community service
Tom Cornell (1956) - American journalist and a peace activist
Paula Donovan (1977) – executive director, AIDS-Free World; Salem Award for Human Rights and Social Justice Foundation recipient
Michael Donnelly (1981) – leading activist for sufferers of Gulf War Syndrome; author of Falcon's Cry
G. Simon Harak (1970) – Director of the Center for Peacemaking at Marquette University
Stephen V. Kobasa (1969) – peace and political activist
Robert J. Wicks (1968) – leading writer about the intersection of spirituality and psychology; Pro Ecclesia et Pontifice recipient

Sports

Basketball
Maurice Barrow (2014) – professional basketball player
Troy Bradford (1989) – professional basketball player; 3x 1st Team Small American
Ajou Deng (2003) – professional basketball player; member of the Great Britain national basketball team
Joe DeSantis (1979) – All-American and professional basketball player
Kathy Fedorjaka (1990) – women's college basketball coach
Greg Francis (1997) – Canadian Olympic basketball player and Junior National Men's basketball coach
Deng Gai (2005) – professional basketball player; 2005 NCAA Division I blocks leader
Marcus Gilbert (2016) – professional basketball player
Pete Gillen (1968) – college basketball analyst and men's basketball coach
Drew Henderson (1993) – professional basketball player; member of the Dutch national basketball team
Art Kenny (1968) - professional basketball player; No. 18 retired by Olimpia Milano
Nick Macarchuk (1963) – men's college basketball coach
Derek Needham (2013) – professional basketball player; member of the Montenegro national basketball team
Tyler Nelson (2018) - professional basketball player
Tim O'Toole (1988) – men's college basketball coach
Darren Phillip (2000) – professional basketball player; 2000 NCAA Division I rebounding leader
Tricia Fabbri (1991) – women's college basketball coach
Rakim Sanders (2012) – professional basketball player; 2x Italian League champion
Brendan Suhr (1979) – men's college basketball coach
Robert Thomson (2004) – professional basketball player in Europe; member of the Rwanda national basketball team
A. J. Wynder (1987) – National Basketball Association player
Keith Urgo (2002) – men's college basketball coach
Mark Young (1979) - professional basketball player

Lacrosse
Brent Adams (2012) – All-American, Major League Lacrosse All-Star and Team USA midfielder
Chris Ajemian (2009) – Major League Lacrosse midfielder
Nate Bauers (2004) – Major League Lacrosse defenseman
Mike Bocklet (2007) – Major League Lacrosse All-Star attackman
Charlie Cipriano (2012) – All-American and Major League Lacrosse goalkeeper
Greg Downing (2007) – All-American, Major League Lacrosse All-Star and Team USA midfielder
C.J. Kemp (2003) – All-American and Major League Lacrosse goalkeeper
Joe Marra (2010) – Major League Lacrosse All-Star goalkeeper
Jack Murphy (2015) – Major League Lacrosse goalkeeper
TJ Neubauer (2016) - All-American and Major League Lacrosse midfielder
Spencer Steele (2000) – All-American and Major League Lacrosse attackman
Peter Vlahakis (2004) – All-American and Major League Lacrosse All-Star face-off midfielder

Soccer
Abby Allan (2001) – New Zealand national football player
Adam Braz (2001) – Technical Director, Montreal Impact; Canadian international and Major League Soccer player
Robyn Decker (2008) – professional football player
Jonathan Filipe (2021) - professional soccer player 
Bryan Harkin (2001) – United Soccer League player
Brett Maron (2008) – National Women's Soccer League player
Jim McElderry (1993) – Rutgers University men's soccer coach and United Soccer League player
Mark Longwell (1982) – U.S. international and United Soccer League player
Michael O'Keeffe (2013) – New Zealand national football and 2014 Olympic player
Nikki Stanton (2013) – National Women's Soccer League player
Justin Thompson (2003) – Canadian international and professional soccer player
Matt Turner (2015) – United States men's national soccer team and Premier League football player
Matthew Uy (2010) – Philippines national football player

Other
Will Brazier (2005) – All-American, U.S. international and Super League rugby player
Keefe Cato (1979) – Major League Baseball player
Evan Centopani (2004) – professional bodybuilder
Paul Sheehy (1985) – U.S. international and Super League rugby player
Brad Troup (2003) – All-American and Super League rugby player
Laura Valentino (2013) - Head coach of the UConn Huskies softball team